Brigitte Lovisa Fouché (born 1958) is a French painter born in Dax (South of France). After graduating from the École nationale supérieure des arts appliqués et des métiers d'art (ENSAAMA), Olivier de Serres in Paris, she worked for 15 years as a glazier painter for Sylvie Gaudin's studio.

Specialising in mural art, Fouche has painted a large collection of acrylic formats in vivid colors and deconstructed patterns. 'A brother gone to Polynesia' remains one of her claimed inspirations.

References

Links 
 Official website
 Artrinet critic of Fouche's works

1958 births
Living people
French women painters
20th-century French women artists
21st-century French women artists